Bruce Bond (born June 25, 1954) is an American poet and creative writing educator at the University of North Texas.

Formal education & academic career 
Bond earned a Bachelor of Arts degree in English from Pomona College, a Master of Arts degree in English from Claremont Graduate School, and a Masters in Music Performance degree from the Lamont School of Music of the University of Denver.  He then worked several years as a classical and jazz guitarist.  In 1987, he earned a PhD in English from the University of Denver. Since then, he has taught at the University of Kansas, Wichita State University, Wilfrid Laurier University (in Canada), and the University of North Texas, where he currently is a Regents Professor of English and Poetry Editor, with Corey Marks, of American Literary Review.

Works 
Poetry

Criticism 

 Plurality and the Poetics of Self, Palgrave (2019).
 Immanent Distance: Poetry and the Metaphysics of the Near at Hand, University of Michigan Press (2015).

Bond's poetry has been published by The Best American Poetry, The Yale Review, Beloit Poetry Journal, The Georgia Review, Raritan, The New Republic, Virginia Quarterly Review, Poetry, The Southern Review, and other journals and anthologies.

Honors 
Bond has received numerous honors, including the 2009 Kesterson Award for Outstanding Graduate Teaching, University of North Texas.  He is a past fellow of the NEA (2001–2002), the Texas Commission on the Arts (1998), the UNT Institute for the Advancement of the Arts (2010), Bread Loaf Writers' Conference (1993; assisted Donald Justice), Wesleyan Writers' Conference, Wesleyan University (1996; assisted Henry Taylor), Sewanee Writers' Conference (1994; assisted Anthony Hecht), the MacDowell Foundation (1993), the Yaddo Corporation (1992), Virginia Center for the Creative Arts (1989), and other organizations.

 1979: Plainspeak Poetry Prize
 1984 & 1986: Academy of American Poets Prizes
 1987: Denver Writer's Award — sponsored by the Colorado Federation of the Arts, judged by poet Ray Gonzalez
 1989: Greensboro Review Literary Award
 1991: Milton Dorfman Prize — Rome Center
 1991: Cincinnati Poetry Review Award — sponsored by the University of Cincinnati
 1994: Billee Murray Denny Award — sponsored by Lincoln College
 1999 & 2003: River Styx International Poetry Prizes
 2002: Inducted into the Texas Institute of Letters
 2011: A William Matthews Poetry Award — sponsored by the Ashville Poetry Review
 2011: New South Poetry Award
 2011: The St. Petersburg Review Poetry Award
 2012: The Knightviille Poetry Award (from The New Guard)
 1993 to 2011 (each year): 23 Pushcart nominations

References

External links
 Selections from For the Lost Cathedral on Blackbird, an online journal of literature and the arts
 NEA feature: Thelonious Sphere Monk
 An Essay on "Homage to Paul Cézanne"
 Interview and the poem Wake
 Interview with Poetry Santa Cruz
 The poem, Audubon, on Poetry Daily

Poets from Texas
American academics of English literature
University of North Texas faculty
Living people
1954 births
Pomona College alumni